is a city located in Iwate Prefecture, Japan. , the city had an estimated population of 25,076, and a population density of 29 persons per km2 in 10,531 households.

Geography
Hachimantai is located in the Ōu Mountains of far northwest Iwate Prefecture, bordered by Aomori Prefecture to the north and Akita Prefecture to the west. The headwaters of the Yoneshiro River are in Hachimanai. Part of Mount Hachimantai and Mount Iwate are within its borders. Parts of the city are within the borders of the Towada-Hachimantai National Park. Mount Iwate, the highest mountain in Iwate Prefecture, is on the border of Hachimantai with Shizukuishi and Takizawa.

Neighboring municipalities
Aomori Prefecture
Takko
Akita Prefecture
Kazuno
Semboku
Iwate Prefecture
Morioka
Ninohe
Takizawa
Ichinohe
Iwate
Shizukuishi

Climate
Hachimantai has a humid continental climate (Köppen climate classification Dfa), the same as much of Hokkaido to the north, characterized by warm to hot summers and cold winters with heavy snowfall. The average annual temperature in Hachimantai is 9.3 °C. The average annual rainfall is 1387 mm with September as the wettest month and February as the driest month. The temperatures are highest on average in August, at around 22.9 °C, and lowest in January, at around -3.4 °C.

Notes

Demographics
Per Japanese census data, the population of Hachimantai peaked at around the year 1960 and has declined steadily over the past 60 years.

History
The area of present-day Hachimantai was part of ancient Mutsu Province. The area was dominated by the Nanbu clan from the early Muromachi period. During the Edo period Tokugawa shogunate, the area was under Morioka Domain, and was divided between Ninohe District in the north and Iwate District in the south.

In the early Meiji period, the village of Arasawa was created within Ninohe District on April 1, 1889, with the establishment of the modern municipalities system. Arasawa merged with neighboring Tayama Village on September 30, 1956, to form the town of Ashiro. Ashiro was transferred to Iwate District on April 1, 2002.

Likewise, on April 1, 1889, the villages of Tairadate, Obun, Dendo and Terada were established within Kita-Iwate District. Kita-Iwate was merged with Minami-Iwate in 1896. The four villages merged on September 30, 1956, for form the town of Nishine.

The city of Hachimantai was established on September 1, 2005, from the merger of the towns of Ashiro and Nishine, and the village of Matsuo.

Government
Hachimantai has a mayor-council form of government with a directly elected mayor and a unicameral city legislature of 22 members. Hachimantai, together with the towns of Iwate and Kuzumaki contribute two seats to the Iwate Prefectural legislature. In terms of national politics, the city is part of Iwate 2nd district of the lower house of the Diet of Japan.

Economy
The local economy is based on agriculture, forestry and seasonal tourism.

Education
Hachimantai has ten public elementary schools and four public middle schools operated by the city government, and one public high school operated by the Iwate Prefectural Board of Education.

Transportation

Railway
 East Japan Railway Company (JR East) - Hanawa Line
  -  -  -  -  -  -  -  -  -  -  -

Highway
  – Nishine IC, Iwatesan SA, Matsuo-Hachimantai IC, Maemoriyama PA, Ajiro JCT, Ajiro IC, Tayama PA
  – Ajiro JCT
  – Nishine roadside station

Sister cities
  Miyako, Iwate – from October 1, 1986
  Nago, Okinawa – from January 28, 1988
  Altenmarkt, Salzburg, Austria, friendship city from November 13, 1994, with former Matsuo Village

Local attractions
Towada-Hachimantai National Park
Mount Hachimantai
Yakehashiri Lava Flow
 Appi Kogen Ski Resort
 Fudō Falls,  One of Japan's Top 100 Waterfalls
Matsuo mine, an abandoned mine
Matsukawa Gorge 
Matsukawa Geothermal Power Plant, the first commercial geothermal plant in Japan
Nanbu Fuji Golf Course 
 Hachimantai hot spring resorts

Notable people from Hachimantai
Hideji Oda, manga artist
Hanahikari Setsuo, sumo wrestler
Ryoyu Kobayashi, ski jumper
Junshirō Kobayashi, ski jumper

References

External links

Official Website 

 
Cities in Iwate Prefecture